The Insane Asylum at the County Poor Farm is a historic building located north of Andrew, Iowa, United States.  It is one of over 217 limestone structures in Jackson County from the mid-19th century.  Built in 1872, this 2½-story structure is composed of stone blocks that vary somewhat in shape and size, and they were laid in courses.  Because of its late date compared with the other historic stone buildings in the county, it features segmental arches instead of lintels.  By the time it was built limestone construction in the county had already reached its peak.  Adam Strasser and Frank Schlecht were contractors from Bellevue, Iowa who were responsible for its construction, as was local stonemason John Weis.  The other 19th-century buildings from the poor farm have been removed, and replaced by the county care facility across the highway.  This building is now part of a demonstration farm. It was listed on the National Register of Historic Places in 1992.

References

Hospital buildings completed in 1872
Vernacular architecture in Iowa
Buildings and structures in Jackson County, Iowa
National Register of Historic Places in Jackson County, Iowa
Hospital buildings on the National Register of Historic Places in Iowa
1872 establishments in Iowa